Huntersville Presbyterian Church is a historic Presbyterian church on CR 21 at WV 39 in Huntersville, Pocahontas County, West Virginia. It was built in 1854, and is a two-story, rectangular frame building, two bays wide and three bays deep. It features a three-story bell tower centered on the front facade and added in 1896. The second floor was added at the same time by Huntersville Masonic Lodge Number 65 for use as a lodge hall.

It was listed on the National Register of Historic Places in 1978.

References

Churches on the National Register of Historic Places in West Virginia
Presbyterian churches in West Virginia
Buildings and structures in Pocahontas County, West Virginia
National Register of Historic Places in Pocahontas County, West Virginia
Churches completed in 1854
1854 establishments in Virginia